Banking in Russia is subject to significant regulations as banks in the Russian Federation have to meet mandatory Russian legislation requirements, and comply with numerous Bank of Russia instructions and regulations.

History

Soviet period
Until 1986, the USSR banking system included 4 components: Stroybank, Vneshtorgbankand, Mrudesberkass and Gosbank.

Perestroika
Perestroika reforms affected the banking system. In June 1987, a plenum of the Central Committee of the CPSUs took place, where it was decided to improve the system. In July 1987, the Central Committee of the CPSU and the "Council of Ministers of the USSR made Resolution No. 821 "On improving the system of banks in the country and strengthening their impact on improving the efficiency of the economy.

The creation of banks on a commercial basis was permitted by the Law "On Cooperation in the USSR", adopted on May 26, 1988.

As part of Mikhail Gorbachev's perestroika program, other banks were formed, including; "Promstroybank" (USSR Bank of Industrial Construction), "Zhilstroybank" (USSR Bank of Residential Construction), "Agrobank" (USSR Agricultural Bank), "Vneshekonombank" (USSR Internal Trade Bank), and "Sberbank" (USSR Savings Bank). "Sberbank" continues to this day as one of Russia's largest banks, retaining senior ex-Gosbank personnel and most of the present Russian government's banking business.

Russian period
The modern Russia inherited the banking system of the Soviet Union, with a few big state banks (like Sberbank, Vneshekonombank, and Vneshtorgbank). After more than 15 years of reforms in Russia, there are now 1183 financial institutions with 3286 regional branches.

1998 financial crisis
In 1988, 41 commercial and cooperative banks were registered in the USSR, including 25 banks on the territory of the RSFSR. By January the 1st, 1990, the statutes of 225 commercial and cooperative banks were registered, including 184 in 1989. In 1990, in connection with the declaration of state sovereignty by the RSFSR, the Russian Republican Bank of the State Bank of the USSR and Russian banks of specialized banks were declared the property of the RSFSR. Also, the Supreme Council of the RSFSR decided to transform all institutions of state specialized banks in the autonomous republics, territories and regions into commercial banks before January 1, 1991. In this regard, the number of banks in the RSFSR increased several times in the second half of 1990. As a result, the number of banks in the Russian Federation was 1360 on January 1, 1992.

2008 financial crisis

Beginning in early October 2008, several Russian banks failed due to liquidity issues related to US credit derivatives. Russian bank Globex barred customers from withdrawing money from their accounts on October 15, 2008, in the first bank run of the current global economic crisis.

2010s
In June 2013 Elvira Nabiullina was appointed as the chairman of the Central Bank of Russia. In an interview with television channel Channel one she said Russia's Central Bank has no blacklists of banks subject to license revocation. She added that the Central Bank will not warn any bank about such measures. She said, "As a matter of fact, no one knows who might be the next, We cannot warn anyone. Moreover, it would be wrong to do that. I know not a single country worldwide where the central banks would warn about license revocation. It is not ruled out that in case a bank is warned, a mala fide owner or managers could divert assets, making settlements with the closest clients, so a rank and file depositor will finally receive much less money".

And so, in December 2013 Central Bank of Russia revoked licenses of three commercial banks, Investbank, Smolensky Bank and the Bank of Project Finance and later then Ecoprombank, Masterbank, Simbirsk and many others. State-run Agency for deposits’ insurance paid money to clients.

Credit and debit cards
At the end of 2008, there were 119 million bank cards in circulation in Russia.

Sanctions
In March 2014, amidst the 2014 Crimean crisis, following the passage of a secession referendum, the declaration of independence of the Republic of Crimea from Ukraine and the process of accession to Russia that followed it, U.S. President Barack Obama announced sanctions on Rossiya Bank. International payment systems Visa Inc. and MasterCard suddenly stopped service of credit cards issued by the Rossiya Bank. Non-cash transactions of SMP Bank (owned by Rottenberg brothers) and Sobinbank (100% subsidiary of Rossiya) were also frozen. Many Russian residents turned to national banks operations although they still have no doubt in reliability of foreign transnational financial institutions.

Banks

Largest banks in Russia in terms of net assets (millions of rubles) as of December 2020:

References

External links

Bank of Russia
Russia Banking News
News
All Banks of Russia